This is a list of medieval roads in Romania, roads that were in used as trade routes during the Middle Ages in the territory of today's Romania.

 Drumul meiului/mălaiului - Millet Road (1583), Oltenia
 Drumul porcilor Pig Road (1584)
 Drumul lemnelor (16th century)
 Drumul Bucureștilor (16th century)
 Drumul Dîrstorului (16th century)
 Drumul Bărăganului (16th century)
 Drumul Mehedinților (1556)
 Drumul Teleajenului (1476)
 Drumul Branului (1476)
 Drumul Prahovei (1476)
 Drumul Teleajenului / Drumul Buților (1476) Brașov - Buzoel - Tabla Buţii - Vălenii de Munte - Bucov
 Calea Zizinului: Brașov - Întorsura Buzăului
 Calea Teliului: Brașov - Întorsura Buzăului
 Drumul Buzăului (1476)
 Drumul Bogdanului (14th century): Poland - Suceava - Bacău - Adjudul Vechi - Buzău - Târgovişte/Bucharest

References

Medieval roads
Romania, Roads and Expressways
Medieval roads and tracks
Medieval Romania
Roads in Romania
Medieval roads
Medieval roads